New York State Route 108 (NY 108) is a  north–south state highway located on the Suffolk County side of the Suffolk–Nassau county line on Long Island, New York, in the United States. It is a spur route connecting NY 25A in Cold Spring Harbor to the Cold Spring Harbor station on the Long Island Rail Road's Port Jefferson Branch via Harbor Road. Harbor Road terminates at an intersection with Woodbury Road, on the Nassau County line, which carries County Route 11 to the east and unsigned County Route 12 to the west. NY 108, assigned in the early 1930s, is the shortest state highway on Long Island.

Route description

NY 108 begins at Woodbury Road at the Nassau County line in the community of Cold Spring Harbor. Woodbury Road continues east as CR 11, which later becomes Pulaski Road. To the west, Woodbury Road proceeds through Nassau County as unsigned CR 12. The road, named Harbor Road, passes to the north of the Long Island Rail Road's Cold Spring Harbor station and runs along the Nassau–Suffolk county line. The route heads northward through a small residential neighborhood. At the intersection with Stillwell Lane, NY 108 southbound crosses into Nassau County, but soon curves away back into Suffolk. Soon after, the two-lane road continues into Trail View State Park, where the route becomes desolate, passing two local ponds. A short distance later, NY 108 enters a small region of houses and intersects with Lawrence Hill Road. At the intersection with Lawrence Hill, NY 108 terminates; just westward lies at an intersection with NY 25A (North Hempstead Turnpike) in Cold Spring Harbor.

History
Harbor Road was improved to state highway standards as part of a project contracted out by the state of New York on September 4, 1919. The roads reconstructed as part of the project were added to the state highway system on January 11, 1921, as unsigned State Highway 1525 (SH 1525). The east–west portion of SH 1525 was designated as part of NY 25 in the mid-1920s; however, the north–south leg did not receive a posted route number until , when it became NY 108. The alignment of NY 108 has not been altered .

Major intersections

See also

References

External links

NY 108 (Greater New York Roads)

108
Transportation in Suffolk County, New York
Roads on Long Island